Susan Stafford (born Susanna Gail Carney; October 13, 1945) is an American former model, actress and television host. She was the original daytime hostess of the American game show Wheel of Fortune from January 6, 1975, until she left on October 22, 1982. She returned to Wheel of Fortune in 1986 to substitute for Vanna White.

Personal life
Born in Lynn, Massachusetts, Stafford grew up in Missouri, and won several beauty contests as a teenager in Kansas City. Stafford moved to California as an adult to work as a television actress.

Stafford married radio pioneer Gordon McLendon in 1973, and was then married to Dick Ebersol of NBC Sports and Saturday Night Live in 1976. Ebersol and Stafford were married on a beach in Malibu. Their wedding was attended by John Belushi, Chevy Chase, and SNL producer Lorne Michaels. After they exchanged vows, Chase jokingly grabbed Stafford and threw her into the ocean. According to People magazine, "[they] parted 18 months later." Their marriage was annulled in 1981.  Stafford later fell in love with game show producer Dan Enright, 28 years her senior. Enright employed her as vice president of Barry & Enright Productions.

Stafford currently lives in Las Vegas.

Career
After leaving Wheel of Fortune, Stafford earned a B.A. in nutrition and an M.A. in clinical psychology from Antioch University, and a Ph.D. in clinical psychology from the unaccredited Pacific Western University. During this time, Stafford returned to television in 1988 as host of Alive, which aired on the Christian Broadcasting Network and in syndication. In 2003, Stafford made her first game show appearance since Wheel of Fortune, appearing on Hollywood Squares Game Show Week (Part 2).

Other Work
In 2011, Stafford published her first book, Stop the Wheel, I Want to Get Off.

Walk of Stars- Golden Palm
In 2005, a Golden Palm Star on the Palm Springs, California, Walk of Stars was dedicated to her.

References

External links
 
 

1942 births
Living people
Game show models
People from Lynn, Massachusetts
American television personalities
American women television personalities
American female models
Wheel of Fortune (franchise)
20th-century American women
21st-century American women
20th-century Christians
21st-century Christians
American Christians
Writers from Massachusetts